Hyo is the Korean name for filial piety, one of the eight Confucian virtues that emphasizes a respect for one's parents and ancestors.

Fictional characters with the given name Hyo include:
Hyo Imawano, a character from the Rival Schools video game series
Hyo Amano, a character from the Last Blade video game series

It can also refer  too:
Kim Hyo-yeon. a member of the South Korean girl group Girls' Generation.